The 3rd Michigan Infantry Regiment was an infantry regiment that served in the Union Army during the American Civil War.

Commanders
 Colonel Daniel McConnell
 Colonel Stephen Gardner Champlin
 Colonel Byron Root Pierce

See also
3rd Michigan Volunteer Infantry Regiment (reorganized)
List of Michigan Civil War Units
Michigan in the American Civil War

Notes

External links
Third Michigan Infantry Research Project
Biographies of Third Michigan Soldiers Online
Michigan Units at The Civil War Archive

Units and formations of the Union Army from Michigan
1861 establishments in Michigan
Military units and formations established in 1861
Military units and formations disestablished in 1864